"Like I Loved You" is a song recorded by American country pop singer Brett Young and co-written by Young and Jesse Lee. It was released to country radio on July 17, 2017 as the third single from his debut self-titled album (2017).

The song has sold 256,000 copies in the United States as of March 2018.

Music video
The accompanying music video was directed by Phillip Lopez and premiered July 31, 2017. It was shot in the Laurel Canyon region of Los Angeles, California, and depicts a narrative of unrequited love.

Promotion and live performances
Young performed "Like I Loved You" and previous single "In Case You Didn't Know" on Jimmy Kimmel Live! on July 18, 2017.

Charts

Weekly charts

Year-end charts

Certifications

References 

2016 songs
2017 singles
Brett Young (singer) songs
Big Machine Records singles
Song recordings produced by Dann Huff
Songs written by Jesse Lee (singer)
Songs written by Brett Young (singer)